Christianity was first introduced to Vietnam in the 16th century. Catholics and Protestants today are reported to constitute 7% and 2% of the country's population respectively; however, the true number might be higher. Christian foreign missionaries are not allowed to proselytize or perform religious activities without government approval.

Catholicism

Foundation period 
In the 10th century, some 'Nestorian' Christian priests had visited Vietnam [the citation seems incorrect; Phu Xuan Ho's discussion is about the 20th century]. The first Catholic missionaries visited Vietnam from Portugal and Spain in the 16th century. In 1524, Portuguese merchant Duarte Coelho's fleet arrived Hội An, central Vietnam, to trade, bringing along Catholic missionaries. A missionary named I-nê-khu arrived in Nam Định, northern Vietnam, in 1533.

The earliest missions did not bring very impressive results. Only after the arrival of Jesuits in the first decades of the 17th century did Christianity began to establish its positions within the local populations in both the regions of Đàng Ngoài (Tonkin) and Đàng Trong (Cochinchina or Quinan). These missionaries were mainly Italians, Portuguese, and Japanese. Two priests, Francesco Buzomi and Diogo Carvalho, established the first Catholic community in Hội An in 1615. Between 1627 and 1630, Avignonese Alexandre de Rhodes and Portuguese Pero Marques converted more than 6,000 people in Tonkin. These Jesuit activities were not always welcomed by the two rival governments of Vietnam. In May 1630, lord Trịnh Tráng of Tonkin issued order to expel the Jesuits. In 1639, some Japanese Christians in Hội An assisted in a revolt against the government; therefore, Lord Nguyễn Phúc Lan of Cochinchina ordered the Jesuits to leave his domain.

In the early 17th century, Jesuit missionaries including Francisco de Pina, Gaspar do Amaral, Antonio Barbosa, and de Rhodes developed an alphabet for the Vietnamese language, using the Latin script with added diacritic marks. This writing system continues to be used today, and is called chữ Quốc ngữ (literally "national language script"). Meanwhile, the traditional chữ Nôm, of which Girolamo Maiorica was an expert, was the main script conveying Catholic faith to the Vietnamese until the late 19th century.

 
Since the late 17th century, French missionaries of the Foreign Missions Society and Spanish missionaries of the Dominican Order were gradually taking the role of the evangelization in Vietnam. Other missionaries active in pre-modern Vietnam were Franciscans (in Cochinchina), Italian Dominicans & Discalced Augustinians (in Eastern Tonkin), and those sent by the Propaganda Fide.

Modern period 
The French missionary and Titular Bishop of Adran Pierre Pigneau de Behaine, who had come to evangelize in Cochinchina, played a role in Vietnamese history towards the end of the 18th century. Pigneau would ingratiate himself to and eventually become confidant to Nguyễn Ánh, the last of the Nguyễn lords, then engaged in a civil war. Pigneau hoped that with a Nguyễn Ánh victory, he would gain concessions for the Catholic Church in Vietnam. A recent study suggests that his contribution to Ánh's success was not as it was conventionally believed to have been.

In August 1798, Emperor Cảnh Thịnh of the Tây Sơn regime in Huế, suspecting that Catholic civilians in Quảng Trị supported and allied with his enemy Nguyễn Ánh, who tolerated Christianity, ordered soldiers to pogrom the Catholics. More than 10,000 Catholic civilians in Quảng Trị were massacred; it was during this time that a Marian apparition of Our Lady of La Vang was reported.

Pigneau and other missionaries bought military supplies, enlisted European soldiers for Nguyễn Ánh and took part in military operations.

Nguyễn conquered Vietnam and became Emperor Gia Long. He tolerated the Catholic faith and permitted unimpeded missionary activities out of respect for his foreign benefactors. Missionary activity was dominated by the Spanish in Tonkin and the French in the central and southern regions. At the time of Gia Long's death, there were six European bishops in Vietnam. The population of Christians was estimated at 300,000 in Tonkin and 60,000 in Cochinchina.

This success would not last, however. Seeking to limit Catholic influence, Gia Long appointed Minh Mạng as his successor for his deeply conservative Confucianism; his first son's lineage had converted to Catholicism and abandoned their Confucian heritage.

A power struggle developed between Minh Mạng and pro-Catholic, pro-Western officials who wanted to maintain the power they had been given by Gia Long. Eventually, 2,000 Vietnamese Catholic troops fought under the command of Father Nguyễn Văn Tâm in an attempt to depose Minh Mạng and install a Catholic "emperor".

The revolt was put down, and restrictions were placed on Catholicism. Persistent rebellions occurred throughout the Nguyễn Dynasty, many led by Catholic priests intent on installing a Christian monarch. During the French colonial campaign against Vietnam from 1858 to 1883, many Catholics joined with the French in helping to establish colonialism by fighting against the Vietnamese government. Once colonial rule was established, the Catholics were rewarded with preferential treatment in government posts and education, and the church was given vast tracts of royal land that had been seized.

After the victorious overthrow of French rule and Vietnam's temporary division in the mid-1950s, Catholicism declined in the North, where the Communists categorized it as a reactionary force opposed to both national liberation as well as social progress. In the South, by contrast, Catholicism was expanded under the presidency of Ngô Đình Diệm, who, through coercion and violence, aggressively promoted it as an important "bulwark" against North Vietnam. Diệm, whose brother was Archbishop Ngô Đình Thục, gave extra rights to the Catholic Church, consecrated the nation to the Virgin Mary, and preferentially promoted Catholic military officers and public servants, while severely restricting the practice of Buddhism and allowing Catholic paramilitaries to demolish sacred Buddhist temples and pagodas. In 1955, approximately 600,000 Catholics remained in the North after an estimated 650,000 had fled to the South in Operation Passage to Freedom.

In 1975, after the withdrawal of US troops, Communist authorities reunited the country by military force and claimed that the religious activities of Roman Catholics were stabilized and that there was no religious persecution. Meanwhile, the Government acted to isolate and neutralize hard-core opposition within local Catholics-to-party policy and to persuade less-strongly-opposed factions to join a party-controlled "renovation and reconciliation" movement. A significant number of Vietnamese Roman Catholics, however, remained opposed to communist authority. Since Đổi mới reforms, the Vietnamese government alternates its treatment of Roman Catholics.

In 1980, the Catholic Bishops' Conference of Vietnam was established. In 1988, 117 Catholics, representing hundred thousands of Vietnamese martyrs who had died for their faith, were canonized by Pope John Paul II.

Protestantism 

 
Protestantism was introduced in 1911 to Đà Nẵng by Canadian missionary Robert A. Jaffray. As part of the Christian and Missionary Alliance, over 100 missionaries were sent to Vietnam, assisting the faith's growth in the country.

By 1967, a number of Protestant communities were represented, mainly within South Vietnam. These communities included the French Reformed Church, Anglican–Episcopalian, Christian and Missionary Alliance, Baptists, Church of Christ, Worldwide Evangelization Crusade, and Seventh-day Adventists. Other Protestant associations were also represented in some social services and welfare agencies. In 1967, there were 150,000 Protestant adherents in South Vietnam, representing about 1% of the total population.

Protestant communities in the North decreased in membership to about 1,200 by the end of the Vietnam War. Several Protestant church properties were confiscated during the communist takeover of South Vietnam in 1975.

In the early 1980s, Protestants were mostly located in the Montagnard communities in southern Vietnam's central highlands.

Present estimates of the number of Protestants range from the official government figure of 500,000 to claims by churches of 1,600,000 or more. The two officially recognized Protestant churches are the Southern Evangelical Church of Vietnam (SECV), recognized in 2001, and the smaller Evangelical Church of Vietnam North (ECVN), recognized since 1963. The SECV has affiliated churches in the southern provinces of the country. By some estimates, the growth of Protestant believers in Vietnam has been as much as 600% over the past ten years. Some of the new converts belong to unregistered evangelical house churches. Based on believers' estimates, two-thirds of Protestants are members of ethnic minorities, including Hmong, Yao, Thai, and other minority groups in the Northwest Highlands, and members of ethnic minority groups of the Central Highlands (Ede, Jarai, Bahnar, and Koho, among others).

At least 50% of the current Protestant population are tribal people, but the Vietnamese government's treatments towards them is varied. The tribal Protestant people in Northern Vietnam do not face Government persecution, but the Protestant southern tribe, notably Hmong and H're tribal groups, suffer from some religious persecution. In May 2006, over 300 Montagnard people remained in Vietnamese prisons for their faith. A young Hroi man who refused to reject his Christian faith reportedly died from injuries received while under official interrogation in April 2007.

Mennonite and Baptist movements were officially recognized by Hanoi in October 2007, which was seen as some improvement of religious freedom in the country. Pastor Nguyen Quang Trung, provisional president of the Mennonite Church in Vietnam, taking part in the official ceremony of the above authorization, quoted his Church's motto: "Living the Gospel, worshipping God, and serving the nation.".

Eastern Orthodoxy

Orthodox Christianity in Vietnam is presented by 3 parishes of the Russian Orthodox Church: one in Vung Tau, named after the icon of Our Lady of Kazan, where there are many Russian-speaking employees of the Russian-Vietnamese joint venture "Vietsovpetro", and also parish of Xenia of Saint Petersburg in Hanoi and parish of Protection of Our Most Holy Lady Theotokos and Ever-Virgin Mary in Ho Chi Minh city. These parishes are included in jurisdiction of the Philippinian-Vietnamese eparchy (Diocese) belonging to Patriarchal Exarchate of the Russian Orthodox Church in South-East Asia (established on December 28, 2018, by its Holy Synod).

The earliest parish, named after Our Lady of Kazan icon, was opened in 2002 with the blessing of the Holy Synod of the Russian Orthodox Church, which had been given in Troitse-Sergiyeva Lavra.

The representatives of foreign relations department and some other structures of the Russian Orthodox Church from time to time come to Vietnam (Hanoi, Ho Chi Minh city and Vũng Tàu) to conduct Orthodox divine services mostly among Russian-speaking community there.

Others
New religious movements such as Jehovah's Witnesses, The Church of Jesus Christ of Latter-day Saints, World Mission Society Church of God, and Eastern Lightning are also active in Vietnam.

Bible translations 

Seventeenth-century Jesuit missionaries were the first to proclaim the Gospel in the Vietnamese language. Girolamo Maiorica compiled the first chữ Nôm catechism (Thiên Chúa thánh giáo khải mông 天主聖教啟蒙) in 1623, and Alexandre de Rhodes printed the first texts in chữ Quốc ngữ, including a bilingual catechism, in Rome in 1651. However, the Bible was not systematically translated. Some portions of the Bible may have been translated and printed in Thailand in 1872.

Jean Bonet, author of a Dictionnaire Annamite-français, translated the Gospel of Luke from French to Vietnamese in 1890. The first translation from Latin was that of Albert Schlicklin (1916), and the first from Greek that of William Cadman (New Testament 1923, Old Testament 1934). The Schilicklin and Cadman Bibles remain the basis of the standard Catholic and Protestant versions today.

The organized work of United Bible Societies in Vietnam began in 1890. In 1966 the Vietnamese Bible Society was established. These societies distributed 53,170 copies of the Bible and 120,170 copies of the New Testament in Vietnamese within the country in 2005.

In 2017 Jehovah's Witnesses released the entire New World Translation of the Bible in Vietnamese.

Persecution 

The historical treatment of Christians in Vietnam has varied over time due to historical, tribal or political forces, both internal and external of the Vietnamese nation. Vietnam's history is particularly tumultuous, and does not reflect how current Vietnam is today.

In the 16th and early 17th centuries, during the Later Lê dynasty, Christians were tolerated. The level of tolerance, however, started to change when the Trịnh lords and Nguyễn lords divided the country. In particular, the Trịnh Lords were more hostile against the Christians and expelled Christian missionaries out the country. In contrast, their Nguyễn rivals were more tolerant of Christians, though not without skepticism. This resulted in more Christians in the south than in the north of Vietnam, a situation that continued from 17th century onward. Prince Nguyễn Ánh, who later became Emperor Gia Long and founded the Nguyễn dynasty from the remnant of old Nguyễn lords, was particularly tolerant of Christians.

However, the persecution of Christians increased with the death of Gia Long, when successive Nguyễn emperors imprisoned, murdered and oppressed Christians Brutal treatment of Christians by the Nguyễn rulers induced French military action in 1858 and ultimately the French conquest of Vietnam. Although many pre-20th century rebellions against France sought to unify Vietnamese regardless of faith, many Vietnamese Christians supported France.

During the French protectorate, the French authority was conventionally viewed as favoring Christians in the country. During the First Indochina War, the communist-led Việt Minh were hostile against those did not support independence of Vietnam under their rule. Communists accused many Vietnamese Christians of possessed pro-French sentiment, justifying their persecution as a by-product of anti-colonial sentiment. "Orthodox" historiography therefore insisted that this was not necessarily religious persecution. In fact, Vietnamese Catholics unanimously supported Vietnam's independence. They initially fought along with Viet Minh, but were later divided on how to resist to the French reconquer of their country when the First Indochina War became a hot spot of the Cold War.

In the aftermath of the First Indochina War, many Christians fled Communist rule in the North, further increasing the Christian population in South Vietnam. South Vietnam's President Ngô Đình Diệm, however, continued to antagonize non-Christians, empowering Christians in the military and civil service and beginning systematic repression of non-Christian, particularly Buddhist, religious practice. Many officials in South Vietnam's government were Christians, and they were given exclusive power. This resulted in the Buddhist crisis and, eventually, the overthrow of his repressive Christian-dominated government. However, this did not eliminate the influence of Christians across the South, and Christians continued to dominate sociopolitical life in the South until 1975.

After 1975, the Communists began to prohibit religious practice, but particularly targeted Christians. Many Vietnamese boat people were Christians, and Christians formed 75% of Vietnamese refugees who fled the country. This resulted in a Western-oriented Vietnamese diaspora still relevant today, as many Vietnamese emigrants in Western Europe, Canada and the United States, belong to Christian sects and heavily oppose Communist rule; by contrast, the Vietnamese diaspora in Eastern Europe is more Buddhist influenced.

Since Đổi mới reforms of 1986, Christianity has started to see a revival, but the Communist government's policies toward Christians are difficult for many Christians and sometimes dangerous. Christians continue to be seen as a threat due to their previous support for the French and Americans. Terrorism against Christians in the country has been a major issue, and the oppression of Christians is still commonly practiced by the Communist authorities.. However, at the same time, the government has lifted some restrictions on religious practices. In particular, Christians can celebrate holidays like Easter and Thanksgiving, and gatherings in churches are common among Christians.

Vietnam is now maintaining a semi-formal relation with the Vatican, a major breakthrough in contrast to other communist countries of China, Laos and North Korea. The Government of Vietnam reached an agreement with the Vatican for further normalization in 2018, which allowed the Holy See to have a permanent representative in Vietnam in the future.

See also 
Bible translations into Vietnamese
Vietnamese Martyrs
Religion in Vietnam

References

Works cited

Hudson Institute. "Vietnam Steps up Persecution of Hmong Christians". Center for Religious Freedom. 2005.
 

Montagnard Foundation press release, 2006. Religious Persecution Continues In Vietnam As Degar Christians Are Tortured For Their Faith
Christianity with an Asian Face: Asian-American Theology in the Making. By Peter C. Phan. Maryknoll, N.Y.: Orbis Books, 2003. xvii + 253 pp.
Report on Vietnam by International Christian Concern 

Christian persecution in Vietnam. Report by CSW

External links 
The Catholic Church in Vietnam by GCatholic.org
Vietnamese Catholic Network in Vietnamese
Vietnamese Global Christian Network in Vietnamese